Sword & Poker is an iOS role-playing game developed by Japanese studio GAIA CO.,LTD. and released January 7, 2010. A sequel entitled Sword & Poker 2 was released on May 2, 2010. A spin-off game was released by Konami on July 16, 2014 entitled Swords & Poker Adventures.

Critical reception

Sword & Poker

Sword & Poker received "generally favorable reviews" just one point shy of "universal acclaim", according to the review aggregation website Metacritic.

Sword & Poker 2

Sword & Poker 2 received "generally favorable reviews" just two points shy of "universal acclaim", according to Metacritic.

Swords & Poker Adventures

Swords & Poker Adventures received "mixed" reviews according to Metacritic.

References

External links
 

2010 video games
IOS games
IOS-only games
Konami games
Role-playing video games
Video games developed in Japan